Stadium de Toulouse is the largest multi-purpose stadium in Toulouse, France. It is currently used mostly for football matches, mainly those of the Toulouse Football Club, as well as rugby matches for Stade Toulousain in the European Rugby Champions Cup or Top 14. It also hosts the test matches of France's national rugby union team. It is located on the island of Ramier near the centre of Toulouse. It is a pure football and rugby ground, and therefore has no athletics track surrounding the field. The stadium is able to hold 33,150 people.

History 
The stadium was built in 1937 for the 1938 FIFA World Cup (but again under construction, the World Cup matches were playing in the Stade du T.O.E.C., 4 kilometers further North) and has undergone two extensive renovations, in 1949 and 1997.

The stadium staged six matches during the 1998 FIFA World Cup.

It was also used as a host venue during the 2007 Rugby World Cup for games such as Japan-Fiji, won by the latter 35–31. On 13 November 2009 the stadium hosted international rugby again when France hosted South Africa. At the time, South Africa were leading the series by 20 wins to 10 (6 drawn).

Michael Jackson performed in front of 40,000 people during his Dangerous World Tour on 16 September 1992.

Transport
The stadium is served by two bus stops (West and East), where Tisséo buses L4 (Cours Dillon-Basso Cambo), 34 (Arènes-Université Paul Sabatier), L5 (Empalot-Roques/Roquettes) and 152 (Empalot-Roques/IUC) stop. Shuttle buses operate on match days from Esquirol metro (Line A), and the stadium is also a short walk (~10 mins) from metro stations Empalot and Saint Michel-Marcel Langer (Line B). It is also near the Croix de Pierre stop of the newly extended Toulouse tramway.

Tournament results

1938 FIFA World Cup 
The stadium was initially one of the venues of the 1938 FIFA World Cup but again under construction, the matches were played in the Stade du T.O.E.C. in Toulouse too.

1998 FIFA World Cup 
The stadium was one of the venues of the 1998 FIFA World Cup, and held the following matches:

2007 Rugby World Cup 
The stadium was one of the venues for rugby union's 2007 World Cup

UEFA Euro 2016 
The stadium was one of the venues of UEFA Euro 2016, and hosted the following matches:

2023 Rugby World Cup matches

Rugby League Test matches
Stadium Municipal has hosted 14 rugby league internationals, 13 of them involving the French national team, since 1953.

Fronton facilities
Stadium de Toulouse is also home to several fronton walls on the stadium campus, which are used for local handball/pelota sports. Most recently, in August 2022, it played host to an international One-Wall handball/Wallball tournament, the 2022 French Open, part of the European 1-Wall Tour, with Great Britain's Dan Grant winning the Men's Open title and Helena Hernanz Sanchez of France winning the Women's Open title. The 2022 Open was organised with the help and support of the Tolosa Gaels GAA Club and the local Government.

References

Toulouse FC
Stade Toulousain
Toulouse
Rugby League World Cup stadiums
Rugby league stadiums in France
Rugby union stadiums in France
Rugby World Cup stadiums
1998 FIFA World Cup stadiums
Multi-purpose stadiums in France
Sports venues in Toulouse
UEFA Euro 2016 stadiums
Sports venues completed in 1937
Olympic football venues
Venues of the 2024 Summer Olympics